List of the museums in Upper Normandy, France:

 Château-musée de Dieppe
 Écomusée de la Basse Seine
 Maison de l’armateur
 Musée Alfred Canel
 Musée Alphonse Georges Poulain
 Musée Biochet-Bréchot (Maison des templiers)
 Musée d’Évreux - Ancien évêché
 Musée de l’Ancien Havre
 Musée de l’horlogerie
 
 Musée de la marine de Seine
 Musée départemental des Antiquités
 Musée départemental Pierre Corneille
 Musée départemental Victor Hugo
 Musée des Arts et de l’Enfance
 Musée des Beaux-Arts de Bernay
 
 Musée des instruments à vent
 Musée des Ivoires
 Musée des sapeurs pompiers de France
 Musée des Terre-Neuvas et de la Pêche
 Musée des Traditions et Arts Normands
 Musée du Prieuré de Graville
 Musée du Prieuré de Harfleur
 Musée du Verre, de la Pierre et du Livre
 Musée Flaubert et d’histoire de la médecine
 Musée industriel de la Corderie Vallois
 
 Musée Louis-Philippe
 Musée Malraux 
 Musée Mathon-Durand
 Musée maritime fluvial et portuaire de Rouen
 Musée municipal d’Elbeuf
 Musée municipal de Barentin
 Musée municipal de Lillebonne
 Musée municipal de Louviers
 Musée national de l’Éducation
 Musée Nicolas Poussin
 Musée Pierre Corneille
 Muséum d’Histoire Naturelle de Rouen
 Muséum d’Histoire Naturelle du Havre
 Overlord Museum
 Pavillon Flaubert

External links

 Musées en Haute-Normandie website

Upper Normandy
 
Upper Normandy